Diamnati is a commune in the Cercle of Bandigara in the Mopti Region of Mali. The commune contains 11 villages and at the time of the 2009 census had a population of 13,349. The main village of Dé lies 62 km northeast of Bandiagara.

References

External links
.

Communes of Mopti Region